Richard "Rick" Holmes (born March 16, 1963 in Philadelphia, Pennsylvania) is an American actor. He received his BA from Gettysburg College and an MFA in acting from New York University. He has played numerous stage roles, including roles in such Broadway productions as Cabaret,  Spamalot, Peter and the Starcatcher and Matilda, among others.

Production credits

Broadway
 Saint Joan (1993) – English Soldier / Knight
 Timon of Athens (1993) – Hortensius
 The Government Inspector (1994) – Lyulyukov / Understudy for Artemy Zemlyanika, Luka Khlopov
 The Deep Blue Sea (1998) – Jackie Jackson / Understudy for Frederick Page
 Major Barbara (2001) – Charles Lomax
 Cabaret (2002–2004) – Clifford Bradshaw
 The Pillowman (2005) – Blind Man / Standby for Katurian and Michal
 Monty Python's Spamalot (2006–2009) – Lancelot / French Taunter / Knight of Ni / Tim The Enchanter
 Peter and the Starcatcher (2012–2013) – Lord Aster
 Matilda (2014–2015) – Mr. Wormwood
 The Visit (2015) – Father Josef
 Junk: The Golden Age of Debt (2018–2019) – Thomas Everson, Jr.

Off-Broadway
 Stop Kiss (Joseph Papp Public Theater/Susan Stein Shiva Theater) - Peter
 Dog Opera (Joseph Papp Public Theater/Martinson Hall) - Steven/Chris/David/Tim/Hank
 Clean (Atlantic Theatre)
 Christina Alberta's Father (Vineyard Theatre) - Master Bone
 Hapgood (Lincoln Center)
 Othello (Delacorte Theatre) - Ensemble
 The Tragedy of Richard III (New York Shakespeare Festival) - Lord Grey/Ensemble
 Peter and the Starcatcher (New World Stages) - Black Stache

National Tours
 Spamalot - Sir Lancelot/The French Taunter/Knight of Ni/Tim the Enchanter
   03/07/06-04/15/06 (Colonial Theatre, Boston, MA)
   04/19/06-06/04/06 (Cadillac Palace Theatre, Chicago, IL)
   06/07/06-07/09/06 (National Theatre, Washington, DC)
   07/31/15-08/02/15 (Hollywood Bowl, Los Angeles, CA) 
 Cabaret
 Angels in America
 Shadow of a Gunman

Regional
 Arena Stage
 Hartford Stage
 Huntington Theatre
 Williamstown Theatre Festival
 Shakespeare Theater

Film
 The Post (2017) -  Murrey Marder
 Melinda and Melinda (2004) - Party Guest (credited as Rick Vincent Holmes)
 The Stepford Wives (2004) - Bob (credited as Rick Holmes)
 Glow Ropes
 Spinster (2002) (credited as Rick Holmes)

TV
 Law & Order
 Law & Order: Special Victims Unit
 Talk to Me
 The City
 The Petrified Forest
 All My Children
 Modern Family
 The Punisher
 Atlanta
 The Politician
 Dead to Me

References

External links
 
 Monty Python's Spamalot - official web site

1963 births
Living people
Tisch School of the Arts alumni
American male musical theatre actors
American male stage actors
American male film actors
American male television actors
Male actors from Philadelphia
Gettysburg College alumni